Sioux County Courthouse may refer to:

Sioux County Courthouse (Iowa), Orange City, Iowa
Sioux County Courthouse (Nebraska), Harrison, Nebraska
Former Sioux County Courthouse (North Dakota), Fort Yates, North Dakota